Wéverton Gomes Souza, simply known as Wéverton (born 8 March 1992), is a Brazilian footballer who plays for Maltese club Pembroke Athleta as a forward.

Club career
Born in Três Lagoas, Wéverton graduated from Londrina's youth setup, and made his first-team debut on 25 January 2012, coming on as a second-half substitute in a 4–0 home routing against Paranavaí, for the Campeonato Paranaense championship. He scored his first goal on 20 January of the following year, netting his side's last of a 4–2 home success against Toledo CW, also in the State Leagues.

On 19 August 2013, after being tracked by Corinthians and Palmeiras in the previous months, Wéverton left Londrina and joined Série B side América Mineiro. He made his debut for Coelho late in the month, starting in a 0–2 home loss against Joinville.

Wéverton finished the campaign with eleven appearances, and after finding his chances limited in 2014, he moved to Portuguesa. After appearing sparingly for the latter (which eventually suffered relegation), he returned to Londrina on 20 November 2014.

References

External links
Wéverton at playmakerstats.com (English version of ogol.com.br)

1992 births
Living people
People from Minas Gerais
Brazilian footballers
Brazilian expatriate footballers
Association football forwards
Campeonato Brasileiro Série B players
Campeonato Brasileiro Série C players
Campeonato Brasileiro Série D players
Maltese Premier League
Londrina Esporte Clube players
América Futebol Clube (MG) players
Associação Portuguesa de Desportos players
Atlético Clube Goianiense players
Esporte Clube Tigres do Brasil players
Toledo Esporte Clube players
Coimbra Esporte Clube players
FC Cascavel players
Brusque Futebol Clube players
Mosta F.C. players
Brazilian expatriate sportspeople in Malta
Expatriate footballers in Malta
People from Três Lagoas
Sportspeople from Mato Grosso do Sul